Graham Henry March (4 May 1925 – 17 May 2016) was an Australian rules footballer who played with St Kilda in the Victorian Football League (VFL).

Prior to his football career, March served in the Australian Army during World War II.

Notes

External links 

1925 births
Australian rules footballers from Melbourne
St Kilda Football Club players
Brunswick Football Club players
2016 deaths
Australian Army personnel of World War II
Military personnel from Melbourne